The 1978–79 Jacksonville Dolphins men's basketball team represented Jacksonville University as members of the Sun Belt Conference during the 1978–79 NCAA Division I men's basketball season. The Dolphins, led by first-year head coach Tates Locke, played their home games at Jacksonville Memorial Coliseum in Jacksonville, Florida.

After finishing fourth in the Sun Belt regular season standings, Jacksonville won the conference tournament to receive an automatic bid to the NCAA tournament as No. 9 seed in the Midwest region. The team was beaten by No. 8 seed Virginia Tech, 70–53, in the opening round to end the season 19–11 (5–5 Sun Belt). This season closed out the most successful decade in program history, as four of the schools five NCAA tournament appearances all-time occurred during the 1970s.

Roster

Schedule and results

|-
!colspan=12 style=| Regular season

|-
!colspan=12 style=| Sun Belt Conference tournament

|-
!colspan=9 style=| NCAA tournament

Source

References

Jacksonville Dolphins men's basketball seasons
Jacksonville Dolphins
Jacksonville
Jacksonville Dolphins men's basketball
Jacksonville Dolphins men's basketball